Chukano horo (Rhodopes) - Чукано хоро (Родопи) is a Pomaks dance from the region of Rhodopes, now in modern-day Bulgaria.

See also
Podaraki
Tropanka
Yuvarlandim

Bulgarian dances
Pomak dances